Hylton Michael Ackerman (28 April 1947 – 2 September 2009) was a South African first-class cricketer. He attended Dale College Boy's High School, where he was head boy.

A hard-hitting left-hander who usually opened the batting, he made his first-class debut in 1963–64 for Border aged 16 whilst still at school. At 18 he was selected to play for South against North, a trial match for the following season's series against Australia, and scored 84; he twice played for a South African XI against the touring Australians in 1966–67 but was unable to break into the strong Test side. Mediocre form prevented his inclusion in the Test side against Australia in 1969–70. He was selected to tour Australia in 1971–72 but the tour was cancelled owing to anti-apartheid protests. He played in the replacement series, for the World XI, hitting 323 runs at 46.14.

He played four successful seasons for Northamptonshire from 1968 to 1971, scoring over 5,000 runs, and continued playing for Western Province until 1981–82. After he retired he became a coach and a television commentator.

His son, Hylton D. Ackerman, played Test cricket for South Africa in 1998.

Ackerman died in 2009 at Cape Town, aged 62.

References

External links
 
 "The Man with a Gleam in His Eye" by Telford Vice

1947 births
2009 deaths
Western Province cricketers
South African cricketers
Northamptonshire cricketers
Border cricketers
International Cavaliers cricketers
South African cricket coaches
D. H. Robins' XI cricketers
People from Springs, Gauteng